Bilbrook may refer to:

 Bilbrook, Somerset
 Bilbrook, Staffordshire

See also
 Billbrook, Hamburg, Germany